Tramea limbata is a species of dragonfly in the family Libellulidae. Its common names include black marsh trotter, ferruginous glider and  voyaging glider.

Distribution 
This migrant is widespread in sub-Saharan Africa, including Madagascar, southern Arabian Peninsula, southern Asia and nearby islands.

Description and habitat 
It is a medium sized red dragonfly with extremely long anal appendages. It can be distinguished from other species of this genus by the dark-brown hind-wing patch, not surrounded by a golden yellow areola, in the base. Female is similar to male; but may be red as the male or yellowish in color. 

This species reproduces in open pools, ponds and in grassy marshes. Adults are often found in bushy areas and around woodlands around them. This dragonfly is commonly seen patrolling over water bodies and open space in sunny days. Pairs in copula or in tandem can also sometimes be seen flying low above water bodies.

See also 
 List of odonates of Sri Lanka
 List of odonates of India
 List of odonata of Kerala

References

External links

Libellulidae
Insects described in 1832
Taxonomy articles created by Polbot